Rolling admission is a policy used by many colleges to admit freshmen to undergraduate programs. Many law schools in the United States also have rolling admissions policies. Under rolling admission, candidates are invited to submit their applications to the university anytime within a large window.  The window is usually over six months long, and some schools do not have a previously specified end date (the window simply closes when all spots are filled).  The university will then review the application and notify the applicant of their decision within a few weeks from submission.

Advantages 
Rolling admission might be less stressful for students, and university admissions offices have less data to process because applications do not all flow in at the same time.  Students can finish their application anytime between the summer before their senior year and midway through their senior year and can submit it at leisure, taking the time to carefully review their application and not getting anxious about a nearing deadline.  The organization receives applications continuously rather than in one or two bursts and is thus able to spend more time on each application individually.

Disadvantages 
Most college guidance counselors advise that students submit their application soon after the school begins to accept them as many believe that colleges look more favorably on students who apply earlier in the year.  Other times, universities may underestimate the number of students who will take the offer of admission, resulting in the number of spots filling rapidly; this can lead to more-qualified applicants being denied.  This can create pressure on students who wait a little longer.  Also, schools often use a first-come-first-served method to grant housing and aid to students.  Applicants who believe rolling admission to mean no deadlines may miss the chance at housing or aid that they would have had if there were one set deadline.

See also
College admissions
College admissions in the United States
Early action
Early decision
Transfer admissions in the United States

References 

University and college admissions
Undergraduate education